Óscar López Vázquez (2 April 1939 – 20 December 2005) was a Colombian international footballer. He competed for the Colombia national football team at the 1962 FIFA World Cup which was held in Chile.

Career
Born in Medellín, López played professional football in Colombia. The defender made his debut for Once Caldas in 1961, before joining Deportivo Cali in 1964. He won four league titles in his 10-year career with Cali.

López made 28 appearances for the Colombia national football team from 1961 to 1972.

Personal
In December 2005, López died from diabetes in Cali.

References

1939 births
2005 deaths
Colombian footballers
Colombia international footballers
1962 FIFA World Cup players
Categoría Primera A players
Once Caldas footballers
Deportivo Cali footballers
Deaths from diabetes
Association football defenders
Footballers from Medellín